Diethylmercury  is a flammable, colorless liquid, and one of the strongest known neurotoxins. This organomercury compound is described as having a slightly sweet smell, though inhaling enough fumes to notice this would be hazardous.
This chemical can cross the blood–brain barrier, causing permanent brain damage. It is, however, considerably less toxic than dimethylmercury.

Synthesis 
Diethylmercury can be obtained from the reaction between ethylmagnesium bromide and mercury(II) chloride.

2 C2H5MgBr + HgCl2 → Hg(C2H5)2 + MgBr2 + MgCl2
Other methods are also known.

See also
 Dimethylmercury, a related compound
 Ethylmercury
 Mercury poisoning

References

Organomercury compounds
Sweet-smelling chemicals